Khasay Khan Utsmiyev was an Imperial Russian general of Kumyk origin.

Life and career 
He was born on 3 April 1808, to Musa Khan Utsmiyev, ethnic Kumyk Prince of Aqsay as his middle son. He had an elder brother named Sultan Murad (d. 1841) and a younger brother Adil. His sister Tuti Bika Khanum was married to Ismayil bek Kutkashensky, the first Azerbaijani ever to be decorated with Order of St. George.

Since childhood, he was sent to Tbilisi as a hostage. After graduating from the Corps of Pages in St. Petersburg from 1825 until the end of his life, Utsmiev served in the Russian army - first as a cadet in the 43rd Jaeger Regiment, later in 1833 he was transferred to the Kherson Grenadier Regiment. He became an officer on March 22, 1834. in 1836 - in the Life Guards of the Grenadier Regiment at the Caucasian Corps. In 1841 he was promoted to second lieutenant and headquarters captain. In 1844 he was a major in a separate Caucasian corps, in 1845 he was promoted to lieutenant colonel and on 9 January 1852 to colonel.

This is when he was married to the Azerbaijani princess and poet Khurshidbanu Natavan. As a devout Sunni going to live among Shias, Khasay Khan also brought a Sunni mullah, Mullah Muhammad, who would become the grandfather of Uzeyir Hajibeyov as well. This marriage didn't please the relatives of the princess, including Gasim bey Zakir who strongly criticized her for marrying her lessers. His slightly blind right eye was often made fun of by Karabakh poets.

In 1857, he was appointed to serve in the Caucasian army for political purposes. He met with Alexander Dumas in 1858, who described him speaking French like a true Parisian, without an accent. He was also in contact with other Caucasian intellectuals such as Mirza Fatali Akhundov, Mirza Shafi Vazeh, Khachatur Abovyan and Gabriel Sundukyan in Tbilisi. He was friends with Decembrist exile Alexander Bestuzhev as well.

In 1861 he was sent to the command of the Commander of the troops in the Dagestan region, a year later he was promoted to major general on 30 August 1862.

Dismissal and death 
He was said to be offended by a discriminative comment and challenged the historian and one of the ideologists of Russian expansionism and chauvinism, General Rostislav Fadeev, to a duel. The reason for the duel was the words in Fadeev's book "Letters from Caucasus", where he insulted Islam and compared Caucasians to underdeveloped children who would not survive without the help of a “white man”. When he heard of Fadeev's writings from Irakli Gruzinsky, Khasay Khan called the general-historian for these words "rascal" but didn't shoot him. This caused huge insecurity issues for Utsmiyev and wrote to authorities to let him to move to Ottoman Empire with his family in 1866. Overseer for Terek Oblast, Mikhail Loris-Melikov however decided to summon him to Stavropol and expel him to Voronezh on 25 April 1866. At first, Utsmiyev attempted to kill himself, but was unsuccessful in his trial. He would die under mysterious circumstances on 3 May 1867 in Voronezh.

Family 
He was married three times:

 Khurshidbanu Natavan
 Mehdigulu Khan Vafa
 Khanbike Khanum (1856–1921)
 A noblewoman from Qaplanov clan
 Azamat Bike (b. 18 September 1859)
 Pari Khanum Hamzayeva
 Reyhanat Bike (b. 12 July 1853)
 Sotikhan Bike (b. 5 July 1859)
 Musa Utsmiev (b. 4 August 1864)
 Sultan Murad Utsmiev (b. 23 November 1866)

Awards 
 Order of St. Stanislaus, 3rd degree (1836)
 Order of St. Anna, 3rd degree (1837)
 Order of St. Vladimir, 4th class with bow (1838)
 Gold saber with the inscription "For Bravery" (1841)

In popular media 
 Sübhün səfiri (2012) — portrayed by Zaur Shafiyev
 Paradise Under The Shade of Swords (1992) — portrayed by Vano Yantbelidze

Gallery

References 

Kumyks
Recipients of the Order of Saint Stanislaus (Russian), 3rd class
Recipients of the Order of St. Anna, 3rd class
Recipients of the Order of St. Vladimir, 4th class
Recipients of the Gold Sword for Bravery
1808 births
1867 deaths